Epifanio Obdulio "Epy" Guerrero (January 3, 1942 - May 23, 2013)  was a Dominican baseball scout who signed more than 50 Major League Baseball (MLB) players for the Houston Astros, New York Yankees, Toronto Blue Jays and Milwaukee Brewers. Epy was the brother of former shortstop Mario Guerrero, and had two sons, Epy Jr. (Sandy) and Mike, who played and Coached minor league ball.

As a Blue Jays scout, Guerrero signed Tony Fernández and Carlos Delgado, and urged upper management to draft George Bell away from the Philadelphia Phillies.

He is considered to have signed more major leaguers than any other scout, including All Stars Cesar Cedeño, Carlos Delgado, Tony Fernández, Dámaso García, Alfredo Griffin, and José Mesa.

Guerrero was inducted into the Dominican Sports Hall of Fame in October , and on January 15, Guerrero received a "Legends in Scouting Award" from the Professional Baseball Scouts Foundation.

MLB players signed
During the 40 years Guerrero scouted for the Astros (1963–1973), Yankees (1974–1976), Blue Jays (1977–1995) and Brewers (1996–2003), 54 of the players he signed eventually reached the major leagues.

Houston Astros
 Cesar Cedeño
 Jesús de la Rosa
 Al Javier
 Luis Pujols
 Luis Sánchez
 José Sosa
 Alex Taveras

New York Yankees
 Juan Espino
 Jesús Figueroa
 Dámaso García
 Domingo Ramos
 Rafael Santana
 Jose Uribe

Toronto Blue Jays

 Carlos Almanzar
 Luis Aquino
 Gerónimo Berroa
 Tilson Brito
 Enrique Burgos
 Francisco Cabrera
 Sil Campusano
 Giovanni Carrara
 Tony Castillo
 Domingo Cedeño
 Pasqual Coco
 Francisco de la Rosa
 Carlos Delgado
 José Escobar
 Kelvim Escobar
 Junior Félix
 Tony Fernández
 Freddy García
 Beiker Graterol
 Toby Hernández
 José Herrera
 Edwin Hurtado
 Alexis Infante
 Luis Leal
 Nelson Liriano
 Fred Manrique
 Domingo Martínez
 Sandy Martinez
 José Mesa
 Julio Mosquera
 Pedro Muñoz
 Abraham Núñez
 Oswaldo Peraza
 Robert Pérez
 Luis Sojo
 William Suero
 Dilson Torres

Milwaukee Brewers
 Alcides Escobar
 Hernán Iribarren
 Luis Martínez
 Guildel Rodríguez

References

External links
Retrosheet

1942 births
2013 deaths
Houston Astros scouts
Major League Baseball scouts
Milwaukee Brewers scouts
New York Yankees scouts
Toronto Blue Jays scouts